Kyle Criscuolo (born May 5, 1992) is an American professional ice hockey forward for the San Jose Barracuda in the American Hockey League (AHL) while under contract to the San Jose Sharks of the National Hockey League (NHL).

Playing career
As a youth, Criscuolo played in the 2005 Quebec International Pee-Wee Hockey Tournament with the Philadelphia Flyers minor ice hockey team.

Raised in Southampton Township, New Jersey, Criscuolo played high school hockey for two seasons at Choate Rosemary Hall in Connecticut and at St. Joseph's Preparatory School in Philadelphia for three seasons.

Criscuolo played in the United States Hockey League with the Sioux City Musketeers before committing and playing collegiate hockey with Harvard University in the ECAC. Criscuolo despite his frame, continued to develop his offensive talent, playing the final two years of his tenure with the Crimson on the top scoring line alongside, Jimmy Vesey and Alexander Kerfoot.

Undrafted, Criscuolo began his professional career at the conclusion of his senior year in the 2015–16 season. He signed a one-year American Hockey League deal for the following 2016–17 season, with the Grand Rapids Griffins on March 29, 2016, and joined the club on an amateur try-out in the closing stretches of the regular season.

In his first full professional season, Criscuolo played in all 76 regular season games with the Griffins and contributed 17 goals and 41 points. He posted 9 points in 19 post-season contests to help the Griffins claim their second Calder Cup in franchise history.

On July 1, 2017, Criscuolo as a free agent agreed to his first NHL deal, signing a two-year entry-level contract with the Buffalo Sabres. He was re-assigned by the Sabres at the completion of training camp to the Rochester Americans of the AHL to begin the 2017–18 season. He added 11 points in 14 games before he was recalled from the Americans to the Sabres on November 16, 2017. He made his debut with the Sabres against the Detroit Red Wings, the NHL affiliate of the Grand Rapids Griffins, in a 3-1 defeat on November 17, 2017.

On July 1, 2019, Criscuolo left the Sabres as a free agent to sign a one-year, two-way contract with hometown team, the Philadelphia Flyers. In the following 2019–20 season, Criscuolo was assigned to AHL affiliate, the Lehigh Valley Phantoms. He collected 8 goals and 24 points in 40 games before he was dealt at the NHL trade deadline by the Flyers along with a 2020 fourth-round draft pick to the Anaheim Ducks in exchange for Derek Grant on February 24, 2020.

As a free agent from the Ducks in the off-season, Criscuolo returned for a second stint with the Detroit Red Wings' organization, agreeing to a one-year, two-way contract with the team on October 9, 2020. On January 12, 2021, the Red Wings assigned Criscuolo to the Grand Rapids Griffins. On July 28, 2021, Criscuolo agreed to a two-year, two-way contract extension to remain with the Red Wings.

During his final season under contract with the Red Wings in 2022–23, Criscuolo registered 5 goals and 10 points through 28 regular season games with the Griffins. On January 18, 2023, he was traded by the Red Wings to the San Jose Sharks in exchange for Jasper Weatherby. He was immediately re-assigned to continue in the AHL with the San Jose Barracuda.

Career statistics

Awards and honours

References

External links

1992 births
Living people
American men's ice hockey centers
Buffalo Sabres players
Choate Rosemary Hall alumni
Detroit Red Wings players
Grand Rapids Griffins players
Harvard Crimson men's ice hockey players
Ice hockey players from New Jersey
Lehigh Valley Phantoms players
People from Southampton Township, New Jersey
Rochester Americans players
St. Joseph's Preparatory School alumni
San Diego Gulls (AHL) players
San Jose Barracuda players
Sioux City Musketeers players
Sportspeople from Burlington County, New Jersey
Undrafted National Hockey League players